CASAR Drahtseilwerk Saar GmbH is a wire rope producing company based in Kirkel, Germany. CASAR develops, produces and distributes wire rope for cranes and other lifting devices. CASAR has 380 employees. The production capacity is 18.000ts (2007).

History
The company CASAR Drahtseilwerk Saar was founded in 1948 by Joseph Verreet . CASAR is an abbreviation for the French term ’Câblerie Sarroise’. CASAR produced the first 8-strand ropes in 1949, in a time, where six-strand-ropes were usual. The ’Space Mountain’ at EuroDisney works with a wire rope from CASAR. 
In 2006, CASAR developed composite ropes to decrease weight.

Since 2007 CASAR has been part of WireCo WorldGroup.

The economist Christoph Müller, professor at the University of St. Gallen, included Casar as a hidden champion in his list of market leaders 2018, which he compiled together with Wirtschaftswoche. According to him, Casar is the world market leader for special wire ropes (crane and mining ropes).

References

External links
 CASAR website
 WireCo Worldgroup website

Manufacturing companies of Germany
Companies based in Saarland
Saarpfalz-Kreis